Mario Engels (born 22 October 1993) is a German professional footballer who plays as a winger for J2 League club Tokyo Verdy.

Club career

On 4 October 2020, Engels signed a two-year contract with Dutch club Sparta Rotterdam.

On 7 December 2022, it was officially announced that Engels would join Japanese side Tokyo Verdy for the 2023 season.

Career statistics

References

External links

1993 births
Living people
People from Troisdorf
Sportspeople from Cologne (region)
Footballers from North Rhine-Westphalia
German footballers
Association football midfielders
Regionalliga players
2. Bundesliga players
Ekstraklasa players
Eredivisie players
Eerste Divisie players
J2 League players
1. FC Köln II players
FSV Frankfurt players
Śląsk Wrocław players
Roda JC Kerkrade players
SV Sandhausen players
Sparta Rotterdam players
Tokyo Verdy players
German expatriate footballers
German expatriate sportspeople in the Netherlands
Expatriate footballers in the Netherlands
German expatriate sportspeople in Poland
Expatriate footballers in Poland

German expatriate sportspeople in Japan
Expatriate footballers in Japan